Graft-De Rijp is a former municipality in the Netherlands, in the province of North Holland. Since 2015 it has been a part of Alkmaar.

It is twinned with Chalfont St Giles in England.

Population centres 
The municipality of Graft-De Rijp consisted of the following towns, villages and/or districts: De Rijp, Graft, Markenbinnen, Noordeinde, Oost-Graftdijk, Starnmeer, West-Graftdijk.

Local government 
The municipal council of Graft-De Rijp consisted of 13 seats, which were divided as follows:

 CDA - 4 seats
 PvdA - 4 seats
 VVD - 4 seats
 Gemeentebelangen - 1 seat

References

External links

Official website

Municipalities of the Netherlands disestablished in 2015
Former municipalities of North Holland
Alkmaar